Mystery Junction is a 1951 British crime film directed by Michael McCarthy and starring Sydney Tafler and Barbara Murray. The screenplay concerns a writer who narrates a crime story for a fellow passenger on a train journey.

Plot
A middle-aged woman, Miss Owens, recognises her fellow train passenger, mystery writer Larry Gordon, from a photograph on the cover of one of his books she is reading. Telling him she is a big fan of his books, she asks him how he gets his ideas for his stories, so he agrees to tell her.....

Suddenly they hear a scream. They discover that a train door has been opened and snow blown in. Gordon and Miss Owens visit all the passengers in the railway carriage. One of them is Steve Harding, handcuffed to police officer Peterson, who has a gun. Harding is to appear in court the next day, charged with the murder of a young woman. The other passengers are a broker, an engineer, a woman and a young man. All of them, in one way or another, are linked with Harding.

They then discover that the train guard has been assaulted and knocked out by an assailant who took his uniform coat and posed as him. Two female stowaways, actresses out of work and short of money, are found hiding in the guard's van.

With another police officer, who was also escorting Harding, missing, it is concluded that the scream they heard likely came from him when he was thrown from the train by an accomplice of Harding's.

All these passengers leave the train at a junction station to join a connecting service, but they find that train has been cancelled because of the snowy conditions. Taking shelter in the station waiting room, the lighting fails and in the darkness officer Peterson is shot and killed, enabling Harding to be released by accomplices and they attempt to make an escape through the snowy darkness, but conditions force them to return. Knowing that the train had been cancelled, other police arrive to provide support to officer Peterson, and the involvement of the other passengers is revealed. A confrontation leads to the shooting of Harding and also the killer of Peterson, who had accidentally shot him in the darkness when trying to shoot Harding.

The scene fades back to Gordon ending his story idea to Miss Owens.

Cast
 Sydney Tafler – Larry Gordon 
 Barbara Murray – Pat Dawn 
 Patricia Owens – Mabel Dawn 
 Martin Benson – Steve Harding 
 Christine Silver – Miss Owens 
 Philip Dale – Elliot Fisher 
 Pearl Cameron – Helen Mason 
 John Salew – John Martin 
 Denis Webb – Inspector Clarke 
 David Davies – Benson 
 Charles Irwin – Hooker

References

External links

1951 films
British crime films
Films directed by Michael McCarthy
1951 crime films
British black-and-white films
1950s English-language films
1950s British films